Russell Monteith Madden (4 June 1910 – 18 July 1966) was an Australian rules footballer who played with Geelong and Essendon in the Victorian Football League (VFL).

Madden played with Sandringham in the VFL from 1936 until midway through 1938, when he was cleared to Mangoplah Football Club in June 1938.

Madden was appointed as coach of the Mangoplah Football Club in 1938 and lead them to the 1938 Albury & District Football League premiership  before returning to Melbourne.

Notes

External links 
		

1910 births
1966 deaths
Australian rules footballers from Victoria (Australia)
Geelong Football Club players
Essendon Football Club players
People from Traralgon